Denise Schindler (born 9 November 1985) is a German Paralympic cyclist.

Life and career

Schindler got into a tram accident when she was 3 years old which resulted in her right leg being amputated below the knee. She began cycling when she was 18.

She participated at the Paralympic Games in 2012, where she won a silver medal in the women's road race C1–3 event, and in 2016, where she won a silver medal in the women's road time trial C1–3 event and a bronze medal in the women's road race C1–3 event.

Schindler worked with software company Autodesk to develop of a new process for making prosthetics for amputees which could be measured digitally and made using 3D printing. The resulting prosthetic was lighter, cheaper and could take five days to make rather than 10 weeks. She used it at the 2016 Paralympic Games.

In 2021, Schindler was elected to represent Paralympic cyclists in the UCI Athletes’ Commission alongside Colin Lynch.

References

External links
 
 

1985 births
Living people
German female cyclists
Paralympic cyclists of Germany
Paralympic silver medalists for Germany
Paralympic bronze medalists for Germany
Cyclists at the 2012 Summer Paralympics
Cyclists at the 2016 Summer Paralympics
Cyclists at the 2020 Summer Paralympics
Medalists at the 2012 Summer Paralympics
Medalists at the 2016 Summer Paralympics
Medalists at the 2020 Summer Paralympics
Paralympic medalists in cycling
German disabled sportspeople
Sportspeople from Chemnitz
German amputees
Amputee category Paralympic competitors
Cyclists from Saxony
People from Bezirk Karl-Marx-Stadt
20th-century German women
21st-century German women